Allemand Peak is a peak lying   south of Moody Peak in the north part of the Boomerang Range of Antarctica. It was named by the Advisory Committee on Antarctic Names in 1964 for Lawrence J. Allemand, construction driver at Little America V in 1958.

References

External links
Geo Names

Mountains of Oates Land